Naias may refer to:

 Naias — a common alternative spelling of the aquatic plant genus Najas.
 Naias — a fresh-water nymph (Naiad) of Greek mythology.
 NAIAS — an acronym for the North American International Auto Show.